John Chapin may refer to:

 John B. Chapin (1829–1918), American physician and mental hospital administrator
 John L. Chapin (1913–1944), United States Army captain
 John Putnam Chapin (1810–1864), mayor of Chicago, Illinois
 John R. Chapin (1827–1907), American artist and illustrator

See also
 Captain John L. Chapin High School, El Paso, Texas, United States